Black Coulee National Wildlife Refuge is a  National Wildlife Refuge in the U.S. state of Montana near the Canada–US border. This very remote refuge is a part of the Bowdoin Wetland Management District (WMD), and is unstaffed. The refuge is managed from Bowdoin National Wildlife Refuge.

References

External links
 Black Coulee National Wildlife Refuge

Protected areas of Blaine County, Montana
National Wildlife Refuges in Montana